Frederic Brenton Fitch (September 9, 1908, Greenwich, Connecticut – September 18, 1987, New Haven, Connecticut) was an American logician, a Sterling Professor at Yale University.

Education and career
At Yale, Fitch earned his B.A in 1931 and his Ph.D. from Yale in 1934 under the supervision of F. S. C. Northrop. From 1934 to 1937 Fitch was a postdoc at the University of Virginia. In 1937 he returned to Yale, where he taught until his retirement in 1977.

His doctoral students include Alan Ross Anderson, Ruth Barcan Marcus, and William W. Tait.

Work
Fitch was the inventor of the Fitch-style calculus for arranging formal logical proofs as diagrams. In his 1963 published paper "A Logical Analysis of Some Value Concepts" he proves "Theorem 5" (originally by Alonzo Church), which later became famous in context of the knowability paradox.

Fitch worked primarily in combinatory logic, authoring an undergraduate-level textbook on the subject (1974), but he also made significant contributions to intuitionism and modal logic. He was interested in the problem of the consistency, completeness, categoricity, and constructivity of logical theories, especially nonclassical logics, and contributed to the foundations of mathematics and to inductive probability. He dealt with the theory of references in "The Problem of the Morning Star and the Evening Star" (1949).

He also contributed to the philosophy of how logic relates to language.

Works
 1952: Symbolic Logic, An Introduction, The Ronald Press Company
 1963: "A Logical Analysis of Some Value Concepts",  (This paper has over 400 citations.)
 1974: Elements of Combinatory Logic, Yale University Press
 1975: (with Alan Ross Anderson, Ruth Barcan Marcus, and Richard Milton Martin):

See also
 Fitch notation

References

External links
 Bibliography of papers by Frederic Fitch on PhilPapers
 Frederic Brenton Fitch Papers. Manuscripts and Archives, Yale University Library.

1908 births
1987 deaths
American logicians
Yale Sterling Professors
20th-century American mathematicians